Patof Khvan (born June 25, 1988) is a Canadian-born Cambodian professional basketball player who currently plays for the Reping Mill City in Cambodia. He was a member of the Cambodian national team during the 2013 Southeast Asian Games.

References

1988 births
Living people
Basketball players from Montreal
Cambodian sportsmen
Canadian men's basketball players
Canadian sportspeople of Cambodian descent
Competitors at the 2019 Southeast Asian Games
People with acquired Cambodian citizenship
Southeast Asian Games competitors for Cambodia